= Bajaha Makanpur =

Village in Uttar Pradesh, India

Coordinates: 28.275739920858534°N 77.50741391813631°E

Bajaha Makanpur is a village in Prayagraj, Uttar Pradesh, India.
